New Kind of Feeling is the thirteenth studio album by Canadian country and pop vocalist Anne Murray, issued in January 1979 on Capitol Records. The recording continued her chart success from the previous year's Let's Keep It That Way, with the newer album hitting #2 and #23 on the United States Country and Pop album charts, respectively. It was certified platinum by the RIAA.

In her native Canada, New Kind of Feeling hit #1 on the Country album charts, and number 6 on the Pop album charts.  In the United States, both of the album's singles, "Shadows in the Moonlight" and "I Just Fall in Love Again", topped the Country and Adult Contemporary charts.  Both tracks were big Pop hits as well, with "Shadows in the Moonlight" reaching number 25, and "I Just Fall in Love Again" reaching number 12 on the Billboard Hot 100.  It stands as one of Murray's biggest career albums.

Track listing
"Shadows in the Moonlight" (Charlie Black, Rory Bourke)
"You've Got What It Takes" (Berry Gordy, Gwen Gordy Fuqua, Tyran Carlo)
"I Just Fall in Love Again" (Steve Dorff, Larry Herbstritt, Gloria Sklerov, Harry Lloyd)
"Take This Heart" (Robin Batteau)
"Yucatan Cafe" (Adam Mitchell)
"You Needed Me" (Randy Goodrum)*[1]
"For No Reason at All" (Barry Mann)
"Raining in My Heart" (Felice and Boudleaux Bryant)
"That's Why I Love You" (Andrew Gold, Gene Garfin)
"(He Can't Help It If) He's Not You" (Steve Gillette)
"Heaven Is Here" (Gene MacLellan)

Personnel
Anne Murray - vocals
Pat Riccio, Jr., Brian Gatto - keyboards
Jorn Anderson - drums, percussion
Peter Cardinali - bass
Aidan Mason, Brian Russell, Bob Mann - guitar
Bob Lucier - steel guitar, dobro
Rick Wilkins & Peter Cardinali - string and horn arrangements

References

1979 albums
Anne Murray albums
Capitol Records albums
Albums produced by Jim Ed Norman
Juno Award for Album of the Year albums